Denbigh Moors (Welsh: Mynydd Hiraethog) is an upland region in Conwy and Denbighshire in north-east Wales, between Snowdonia and the Clwydian Range. It includes the large reservoirs Llyn Brenig and Llyn Alwen, and the Clocaenog Forest, which has one of Wales's last populations of red squirrels. It also contains the open heath Hafod Elwy Moor National Nature Reserve.

On its western edge, overlooking the Conwy Valley, lies the Moel Maelogan wind farm. Three other summits reach over 500 metres – Craig Bron-banog (502 metres), Gorsedd Bran (518 metres), and Foel Goch (Marial Gwyn) (519 metres).

The ruined hunting lodge of Gwylfa Hiraethog (known locally as Plas Pren due to its original timber construction)  lies at a height of 498 metres (1633 feet).                                                                           Built by the grocery tycoon Hudson Kearley lies on the moors, and nearby is one of the highest inns in Britain, the Sportsmans Arms. As well as the large reservoirs of Llyn Brenig and Alwen Reservoir there are two sizeable natural lakes – Llyn Alwen and Llyn Aled, and two small ones, Llyn Bran and Llyn y Foel-frech – as well as another reservoir, Aled Isaf Reservoir (lower Aled Reservoir).

References

External links
 Clwyd-Powys Archaeological Trust – Mynydd Hiraethog

Mountains and hills of Conwy County Borough
Mountains and hills of Denbighshire
Moorlands of Wales